The Bay League is a high school athletic conference in the South Bay region of Los Angeles County, California affiliated with the CIF Southern Section.

Member schools
Culver City High School
Mira Costa High School
Palos Verdes High School
Peninsula High School
Redondo Union High School
Santa Monica High School

Former members
Centennial High School
Leuzinger High School

References

CIF Southern Section leagues